Douglas is an agricultural and stock farming town situated near the confluence of the Orange and Vaal Rivers in the Northern Cape province of South Africa. Notably the rural town has a diverse population, with mostly state institutions and the anchor private employer, GWK, an agricultural company.

Location 
Douglas lies about 100 km southwest of Kimberley the capital of the Northern Cape. These two are connected by the R357 road.

History 

The town was founded in 1848 as a mission station on the farm Backhouse by the Reverend Isaac Hughes, who had been working along the Vaal River since 1845. In 1867, a group of Europeans from Griquatown signed an agreement giving them the right to establish a town. The town was named after General Sir Percy Douglas, Lieutenant Governor of the Cape Colony.

Notable people from Douglas 
 Ingrid Jonker, poet
 Hannes Nienaber, journalist

References 

Populated places in the Siyancuma Local Municipality
Populated places established in 1848